The Good Neighbor is a 2016 American psychological horror film directed by Kasra Farahani and written by Mark Bianculli and Jeff Richard. The film stars James Caan, Logan Miller and Keir Gilchrist. The film was released on September 16, 2016, by Vertical Entertainment.

Plot 
Ethan (Miller) and Sean (Gilchrist) are tech-savvy high-school teenagers who decide to prank their neighbor Harold Grainey (Caan) by convincing him that his house is haunted. When Grainey leaves home one morning, the two set up equipment to simulate the haunting, as well as hidden cameras that will broadcast Grainey's reactions.

As the basis for a school project, Ethan requests Sean's assistance in setting up hidden cameras at Grainey's home so both can view a person's unfiltered reaction to being haunted by a poltergeist, despite Sean's initial reservations. The cameras are set up so that both can monitor Grainey's reactions for six weeks live from computers in Ethan's bedroom. Grainey has a reputation for being hostile, a recluse, and a "creepy old man" in the neighborhood, which makes it easier for Ethan to justify choosing him as his subject.

Ethan starts to initiate activities aimed at unsettling Grainey to make him believe the house is haunted, including making the kitchen door bang loudly in the middle of the night, disabling the heating system (which causes the bedroom window to shatter because of the freezing temperature), and activating the stereo in the middle of the night.

Throughout the movie, we are shown flashforwards to a criminal trial and flashbacks of Grainey and his wife. These flashbacks are all linked with the "paranormal" activities that the boys try to use to unsettle Grainey. For example, a flashback shows Grainey's wife dancing to music at 3 a.m. and crying, and one of the activities the boys do is play the same song at a similar time. Another example is how Grainey's wife used to complain about the door not shutting correctly and banging. The first activity the boys did was slam the door continuously, leading to Grainey destroying it with an axe.

Sean and Ethan are mystified by Grainey's ability to withstand all these strange occurrences. In one instance, they observe Grainey being disturbed by all the strange noises and then going down to the house's basement. The duo is not able to observe what he does, as they were not able to set up a camera there as the door was locked. Grainey goes down at about 11:30 p.m. and only emerges after 7:30 a.m. This leaves Ethan perplexed, and he vows to determine the reason. They then try calling the police, claiming they heard a woman screaming in his basement. The police officer arrives and Grainey allows him to look in the basement, and the officier leaves after being satisfied there is nothing of concern.

Ethan begins to push for them to break into Grainey's basement, but Sean refuses. In an argument with Ethan, Sean discloses to Ethan that he knows the true reason why Ethan has targeted Grainey: Grainey was responsible for sending Ethan's father to jail many years ago. Ethan's father was an alcoholic who beat his wife regularly. During one such episode, Ethan's mother ran to Grainey for help. Grainey informed the police, which led to Ethan's father being jailed and ultimately getting divorced from his wife. Ethan believes Grainey is responsible for destroying his family and making him lose his father. In the meantime, Ethan throws a Halloween party, and Sean and his new girlfriend decide to make out in a spare bedroom. His girlfriend notices a camera installed on top of the bed, which leaves Sean enraged.

Sean asks Ethan to return all his equipment, but Ethan refuses, threatening Sean with the fact that the equipment was purchased using his credit card and that it is covered in Sean's fingerprints. In the middle of their argument, they observe Grainey's cat toppling over one of the living room cameras. Ethan runs to his home to collect the camera, and in doing so finds the basement door unlocked. He goes down to find that Grainey had made a shrine to his late wife in the basement. Ethan lifts a bell which Grainey gifted his wife, causing the bell to make a sound which awakes Grainey. Fearing for his safety, Ethan hides in the living room, placing the bell on a table. Grainey sees the bell and kills himself with his gun.

It is then revealed in a series of flashbacks that Grainey loved his wife dearly, and he had set up a room where he could take care of her, including arranging a nurse. The viewer then realizes that every activity performed by the boys related to Grainey's wife somehow, and Grainey is convinced that he is being haunted by his wife. A flashback is shown when Grainey first gives her the bell, saying that whenever she needed him, she only had to ring the bell. The bell noise that woke him and the fact that the bell was on the table leads Grainey to believe it was as a sign that his wife wants him to be with her, which is why he killed himself.

Ethan and Sean are arrested and sentenced to two years' probation and 500 hours of community service. Leaving the courthouse, Sean and the girls seem to share a glance and head in opposite directions. Ethan is surrounded by a slew of reporters and cameras. Having finally gained the attention he admitted to craving in an earlier scene, a slight smile appears on his face.

Cast 

 James Caan as Harold Grainey
 Logan Miller as Ethan Fleming
 Keir Gilchrist as Sean Turner
 Laura Innes as Caroline Grainey
 Edwin Hodge as Officer Christopher Palmer
 Anne Dudek as Elise Fleming
 Bailey Noble as Carly
 Lili Reinhart as Ashley
 Mindy Sterling as Mae
 Nik Dodani as Sanjay
 Tamlyn Tomita as Heather Cromwell
 Dean Cameron as Defense Attorney
 William Charles Mitchell as Judge
 Billy Khoury as Neighbor
 Ted King as Sean's Father
 Luke Spencer Roberts as Ted Spiegelman
 Elyse Dinh as Reporter #1
 Hannah Else Pilkington as Reporter #3

Release 
The Austin, Texas premiere, through the South by Southwest Film Festival, was well attended and featured appearances from the director, producers and stars.

On May 10, 2016, Variety announced that Vertical Entertainment had acquired North American theatrical distribution rights, with a release tentatively planned for fall of 2016. The film was scheduled to be released on September 16, 2016.

Reception 
On review aggregator website Rotten Tomatoes, the film holds an approval rating of 33% based on 15 reviews, with a weighted average of 5.30/10. On Metacritic, the film has a weighted average score of 32 out of 100, based on 6 critics, indicating "generally unfavorable reviews".

Dennis Harvey of Variety noted that, despite featuring few locations, the film "doesn't suffer from staginess or claustrophobia", though he pined for "more insight into the protagonists’ family, friends and community." Trace Thurman of Bloody Disgusting singled out James Caan, saying that he delivered "an understated performance with extremely minimal dialogue." Likewise, Michael Roffman of Consequence of Sound praised Caan's performance, but felt that it was lost in "erratic sequencing."

References

External links 
 
 

2016 films
2016 thriller films
American thriller films
Films set in California
Vertical Entertainment films
Films set in 2014
Films scored by Andrew Hewitt
2010s English-language films
2010s American films